Magnolia Hall of Natchez, Mississippi, is also known as the Henderson-Britton House and was built in 1858. As a Greek Revival mansion it is a contributing property to the Natchez On Top of the Hill Historic District, listed on the National Register of Historic Places.

Magnolia Hall was built by Thomas Henderson, a wealthy merchant, planter and cotton broker.  The home is one of the finest examples in Natchez of the Greek Revival style.

During a bombardment of Natchez by the Union gunboat Essex, a shell hit the soup tureen in Magnolia Hall's kitchen.

The Natchez Garden Club has restored Magnolia Hall.  Rooms on the main floor are filled with mid-nineteenth century antiques, while rooms on the upper floors contain a costume collection.

Magnolia Hall is open for tours, and there is a gift shop.

Gallery

References

External links
 Magnolia Hall - Natchez Pilgrimage Tours

Houses on the National Register of Historic Places in Mississippi
Greek Revival houses in Mississippi
Houses completed in 1858
Houses in Natchez, Mississippi
Museums in Natchez, Mississippi
Historic house museums in Mississippi
National Register of Historic Places in Natchez, Mississippi
Individually listed contributing properties to historic districts on the National Register in Mississippi